The Salgotarjani Street Jewish Cemetery (Hungarian: Salgótarjáni úti zsidó temető) is a Jewish cemetery in Budapest, Hungary. It is located in the 8th district of Budapest Józsefváros, besides Kerepesi Cemetery (officially named Fiumei úti nemzeti sírkert), with a stone wall between them.

It opened in 1874 and is now the oldest remaining Jewish cemetery on the Pest side of the city. When it was created, it was the third, after the cemeteries of Vaci and Lehel Streets; since, these ones have disappeared, and buildings have been erected there.

References 
 Jewish Budapest. Monuments, rites, history, by Kinga Frojimovics, Geza Komoroczy, Viktoria Pusztai and Andrea Strbik. Central European University Press, 1999. 
 A Salgótarjáni utcai zsidó temető, by Vilmos Tóth and Károly Zsolt Nagy. Nemzeti Örökség Intézete, 2014.

External links 

 Kerepesi/Salgótarjáni utca Cemetery, Budapest, on Jewish Heritage Europe.
 

Cemeteries in Budapest
Jewish cemeteries in Hungary
Józsefváros
1874 establishments in Austria-Hungary
19th-century establishments in Hungary
Cemeteries established in the 1870s